KDEF-LP (101.5 FM) was a radio station broadcasting a religious format. Licensed to Adelanto, California, United States, it served the Victor Valley area. The station was owned by Calvary Chapel of Adelanto.

Much of its programming replicated that of KWVE-FM in San Clemente, California.

KDEF-LP ceased operations on August 8, 2017, and surrendered its license to the Federal Communications Commission (FCC) for cancellation the following day. These actions were taken due to Calvary Chapel of Adelanto's application for a license for its new construction permit, KPTG-LP. The FCC cancelled KDEF-LP's license on August 11, 2017.

External links
 

DEF-LP
DEF-LP
Mass media in San Bernardino County, California
Victor Valley
Radio stations established in 2006
2006 establishments in California
Defunct radio stations in the United States
Radio stations disestablished in 2017
2017 disestablishments in California
Defunct religious radio stations in the United States
DEF-LP